Ashot III was a king of Armenia, ruling the medieval kingdom of Armenia from 952/53–77. Known as Ashot III the Merciful (Աշոտ Գ Ողորմած) and acknowledged by foreign rulers as the Shahanshah (king of kings) of Mets Hayk' (Greater Armenia), he moved his royal seat of residence to Ani and oversaw its development and of the kingdom as a whole. Armenia reached the height of its golden era during his reign and that of his sons and successors, Smbat II (977–89) and Gagik I (990–1020).

Reign 
During the first year of his reign Ashot launched a military assault to free the city of Dvin from Muslim rule, an undertaking that ultimately ended in failure. Despite this setback, he took steps to centralize power in the kingdom, patronizing the Armenian Church in exchange for its support. During his reign Catholicos Anania I Mokats'i moved his patriarchal seat to Argina, near the city of Ani.

In 961 Ani was proclaimed the capital of the kingdom, and Ashot set himself to enriching and expanding the city. Ashot constructed a wall enclosing Ani and that would later take its name after him, and sponsored the building of monasteries, hospitals, schools, and almshouses. His consort, Queen Khosrovanuysh, meanwhile sponsored the construction of the churches in Sanahin and Haghpat.

In the war between the Byzantine emperor John Tzimiskes and the Arabs, Armenia did its best to remain neutral and forced the two battling parties to respect the boundaries of its country. The Byzantine army began to march across the plain of Mush, thinking to strike the decisive blow against the Arabs from Armenia, but when they met with the 30,000-strong army of Ashot III, they altered their plan and left Armenia. Ashot instead provided Tzimiskes with 10,000 soldiers, who accompanied his men in their campaign in Mesopotamia.

Scholars have suggested that he was buried either in Ani or at the nearby Horomos monastic complex.

Sub-kingdoms
A new phenomenon that began under Ashot III's reign and continued under his successors was the establishment of sub-kingdoms throughout Bagratuni Armenia. Ashot III had sent his brother Mushegh I to rule in Kars (Vanand) and had allowed him to use the title of king. The administrative district of Dzoraget near Lake Sevan was given to Ashot's son Gurgen, the progenitor of the Kyurikid line, in 966, who would later assume the title of king. The proliferation of so many kingdoms worked to the benefit of Armenia so long as the king in Ani remained strong and maintained his hegemony over other kings. Otherwise, the kings, as well their respective bishops who would claim the position of catholicos and formulate their own doctrines, would begin to test the limits of their autonomy.

References 

Bagratuni dynasty
Kings of Bagratid Armenia
10th-century monarchs in Asia
Year of birth uncertain
950s births
977 deaths
10th-century Armenian people